Kushk-e Bala is a village in Alborz Province, Iran.

Kushk-e Bala may also refer to:
 Kushk-e Bala, Kerman
 Kushk-e Bala, Kohgiluyeh and Boyer-Ahmad
 Kushk-e Bala, Semnan